William Hillhouse (19 November 1891 – 21 August 1968) was a Scottish footballer who played mainly as an outside left. The major event of his career was appearing in the 1920 Scottish Cup Final with Albion Rovers, scoring the second of his side's goals in a 3–2 defeat to Kilmarnock (his hometown club). Hillhouse also played for Motherwell – he was contracted there for six seasons but only played for them in the first two, possibly due to commitments relating to World War I – and Third Lanark, touring South America with the latter in the summer of 1923 and appearing on the losing side in the Glasgow Cup final later that year.

His younger brother Hugh spent three seasons with Queen's Park; their cousin John, who grew up on the same street in Hurlford, was also a footballer.

References

1891 births
1968 deaths
Scottish footballers
Albion Rovers F.C. players
Motherwell F.C. players
Galston F.C. players
Nithsdale Wanderers F.C. players
Third Lanark A.C. players
Footballers from East Ayrshire
Scottish Junior Football Association players
Scottish Football League players
Association football outside forwards
Renfrew Victoria F.C. players